The Maserati Quattroporte is a four-door full-size luxury sports sedan produced by Italian automobile manufacturer Maserati. The name translated from Italian means "four doors". The car is currently in its sixth generation, with the first generation introduced in 1963.

Quattroporte I (AM107, 1963–1969)

The original Maserati Quattroporte (Tipo AM107) was built between 1963 and 1969. It was a large saloon powered by V8 engines—both firsts for a series production Maserati automobile.

History
The task of styling the Quattroporte was given to Turinese coachbuilder Pietro Frua, who drew inspiration from a special 5000 GT (chassis number 103.060) which he had designed in 1962 for Prince Karim Aga Khan. While the design was by Frua, body construction was carried out by Vignale.

Series I (1963–1966)

The Quattroporte was introduced at the October–November 1963 Turin Motor Show, where a pre-production prototype was on the Maserati stand next to the Mistral coupé. Regular production began in 1964.
It was equipped with a 4.1-litre V8 engine, rated at  DIN at 5,000 rpm, and equipped with either a five-speed ZF manual transmission or a three-speed Borg Warner automatic on request.
The car was also exported to the United States, where federal regulations mandated twin round headlamps in place of the single rectangular ones found on European models.

Maserati manufactured 230 of its first generation Quattroportes Between 1963 and 1966.

Series II (1966–1969)

In 1966, Maserati revised the Tipo 107, adding the twin headlights already used on the U.S. model. A leaf-sprung solid axle took the place of the previous De Dion tube. The interior was completely redesigned, including the dashboard which now had a full width wood-trimmed fascia.
In 1968 alongside the 4.1-litre a 4.7-litre version became also available (AM107/4700), developing  DIN. Top speed increased to a claimed , making the Quattroporte 4700 the fastest four-door sedan in the world at the time.

Around 500 of the second series were made, for a total of 776 Tipo 107 Quattroportes. Production ended in 1969.

Specifications

The first generation of the Quattroporte had a steel unibody structure, complemented by a front subframe.
Front suspension was independent, with coil springs and hydraulic dampers. Rear suspension used a coil sprung De Dion tube featuring inboard brakes on the first series, later changed to a more conventional Salisbury leaf sprung solid axle with a single trailing link on the second series. On both axles there were anti-roll bars. Brakes were solid Girling discs all around. A limited slip differential was optional.

Engines
The long lived quad cam, all-aluminium Maserati V8 engine made its début on the Quattroporte. It featured two chain-driven overhead camshafts per bank, 32 angled valves, hemispherical combustion chambers, inserted cast iron wet cylinder liners, and was fed through an aluminium, water-cooled inlet manifold by four downdraft twin-choke Weber carburetors—initially 38 DCNL 5 and 40 DCNL 5 on 4200 and 4700 cars respectively, later changed to 40 DCNF 5 and 42 DCNF 5 starting from December 1968.

Special models (AM121, 1971 and 1974)

In 1971, Karim Aga Khan ordered another special one-off based on the Maserati Indy platform. Rory Brown was commissioned as the chief engineer of the project. Carrozzeria Frua designed the car, the prototype of which was displayed in 1971 and 1972 in Paris and Geneva respectively. The car was production ready, even receiving its own chassis code (AM 121), but new owner Citroën used their influence to have Maserati develop the SM-based Quattroporte II instead. Only two vehicles were finished, chassis #004 was sold by Maserati to the Aga Khan in 1974, and the prototype #002 went to the King of Spain, who bought the car directly from Frua.

Quattroporte II (AM123, 1974–1978)

The second generation Quattroporte, named Maserati Quattroporte II (AM 123), was introduced at the Paris Motor Show and the Turin Motor Show in October 1974.  As the result of Citroën’s joint-venture with Maserati in 1968, Quattroporte II was very different from its predecessor and the other Maserati cars in the past. Basing on a stretched Citroën SM chassis, Quattroporte II featured the mid-engine, front-wheel-drive layout, hydropneumatic suspension, four fixed headlamps with two swivelling directional headlights, and V6 engine. The bodywork was designed by Marcello Gandini at Bertone.

Maserati had planned to equip Quattroporte II with V8 engine, but the Maserati’s Tipo 107 V8 engine was too large for Citroën SM chassis and too obsolete. A prototype 4.0-litre V8 engine was built from two compact Citroën-Maserati V6 engines. Maserati cut through the rear cylinders in half on one block (2.5 cylinders per bank, discarding the rear) and the middle cylinders in half on another block (1.5 cylinders per bank, discarding the front) then welded the blocks together. The new V8 engine was fitted to Citroën SM for durability test that lasted  and to prove that the chassis was robust enough to handle more power. Alejandro de Tomaso, the Italian entrepreneur who took over Maserati in 1975, cancelled the V8 engine programme.

A single running prototype was built and tested in 1974. The 1973 oil crisis and the collapse of Citroën’s finances in 1974 prevented Maserati from gaining the EEC approval for the European market. The production did not commence until 1976, and each Quattroporte II was built to order and sold in the Middle East and Spain where the type approval wasn’t needed. Only twelve production cars were built from 1976 to 1978.

The engineering and development had cost Maserati about four billion lire by the time the production ended in 1978.

Quattroporte III/Royale (AM330, 1979–1990)

The third generation of the Maserati Quattroporte (Tipo AM 330) was developed under the Alejandro de Tomaso-GEPI ownership. After the Citroën-era front-wheel drive Quattroporte II, the third generation returned to rear-wheel drive with a large Maserati V8 engine. The exterior was designed by Giorgetto Giugiaro.

History
From 1974 to 1976, Giorgetto Giugiaro presented two Italdesign show cars on Maserati platforms, called the Medici I and Medici II. The latter had features that would make it into the production version of the third-generation of the Quattroporte.

A pre-production Quattroporte was introduced to the press by the then Maserati president Alejandro de Tomaso on 1 November 1976, in advance of its début at the Turin Motor Show later that month. It was only three years later though, in 1979, that the production version of the car went on sale. De Tomaso, who disliked Citroën, removed all of the influence of the French marque from the car. The quad-cam V8 engines built from scratch for the Kyalami were used as well as other mechanical parts. The SM V8 engine prototype under development in the Citroën ownership was also scrapped and the staff was replaced, the most notable being head engineer Giulio Alfieri who was replaced by Aurelio Bertocchi. The hydraulic system of the Quattroporte II was replaced by a conventional power steering setup and the suspension geometry was akin to the Jaguar XJ.

Initially badging reading "4PORTE" was used, but this was changed in 1981 to ones spelling out "Quattroporte." The interior was upholstered in leather and trimmed in briar wood. The climate controls came from the Mopar parts bin on early US-spec cars. In 1984, the climate control system was upgraded to share parts with the mass produced Biturbo.

The Quattroporte III marked the last of the hand-built Italian cars; all exterior joints and seams were filled to give a seamless appearance. From 1987 onwards, the Royale superseded the Quattroporte. The Quattroporte III was an instant success and 120 units were sold in Italy in 1980 alone.

Maserati Royale

On 14 December 1986, at Maserati's 60th anniversary as a car manufacturer, De Tomaso presented the Maserati Royale in Modena, a built-to-order, ultra-luxury version of the Quattroporte. Besides the usual leather upholstery and veneer trim, the car featured a revised dashboard with an analogue clock, four electrically adjustable seats, retractable veneered tables in the rear doors, and a mini-bar. Visually, the Royale was distinguished by new disc-shaped alloy wheels and silver-coloured side sills. A limited production run of 120 cars was announced, but when production ceased in 1990 only 53 cars were completed.

In all, including the Royale, production of the Quattroporte III amounted to 2,155 units in total.

Specifications

The Quattroporte III utilised an all-steel unibody structure. The chassis was related to that of the Kyalami, in turn derived from the De Tomaso Longchamp and therefore ultimately related to the De Tomaso Deauville luxury saloon.
Front suspension was of the double wishbone type, with single coaxial dampers and coil springs and an anti-roll bar.
The rear axle used a peculiar layout very similar to Jaguar independent rear suspension. Each cast aluminium hub carrier was linked to the chassis only by a single lower wishbone, the half shafts doubling as upper control arms, and was sprung by twin coaxial dampers and coil springs units. Rear brakes were mounted inboard, the callipers were bolted directly to the housing of the differential. The entire assembly was supported by a bushing-insulated crossbeam. Initially a Salisbury-type limited slip differential was used; in 1984 it was replaced by a more advanced Gleason-licensed Torsen—or "Sensitork" in Maserati parlance.

The engine was an evolution of Maserati's own all-aluminium, quad overhead cam V8, fed by four Weber carburetors. The automatic transmission used was a three-speed Chrysler A727 "Torqueflite" gearbox. The manual gearboxes are ZF S5 five speed units. When leaving the factory all the cars were originally fitted with Pirelli Cinturato 205VR15 tyres (CN72).

Coachbuilders
Milanese coachbuilder Carrozzeria Pavesi outfitted several armoured Quattroportes during the 1980s.
One of them, a 1983 Blu Sera example nicknamed Calliope, was notably used by President of the Italian Republic Sandro Pertini as the official state car during his tenure.

Autocostruzioni SD of Turinese coachbuilder Salvatore Diomante also offered a 65 cm longer limousine version, fully equipped with white leather, "abundant burr walnut", mini-bar, video cassette player and many other necessities. The price of the Diomante limousine at its introduction in 1986 was 210 million lire.

Quattroporte IV (AM337 1994–2001)

The fourth generation of the Quattroporte (Tipo AM337) was manufactured from 1994 to 2001 and was the first car to be produced under the Fiat ownership after Alejandro de Tomaso sold his entire holding to the Italian marque in 1993. It was built on an evolved and stretched version of the Biturbo saloon's architecture, and used the twin-turbocharged V6 and later the new AM578 V8 engine from the Shamal flagship grand tourer. For this reason, the car retained very compact exterior dimensions, and is smaller than any of its predecessors and successors. As the designer's signature angular rear wheel arches gave away, the wedge-shaped aerodynamic body was penned by Marcello Gandini.

History

The world première of the fourth generation of the Quattroporte took place at the April 1994 Turin Motor Show and the car went on sale towards the end of the year. Initially the Quattroporte was powered by the twin-turbocharged, 24-valve V6 engines from the Ghibli. As local taxation strongly penalised cars over two-litre in displacement, Italian buyers were offered a 2.0 L version, which developed a little more power but less torque than the 2.8-litre version; on the home market, the 2.8 was not offered until a year after its introduction.
The cabin was fully upholstered in Connolly leather and trimmed in elm burl wood veneer. Weight was also reduced by at least  as compared to the Quattroporte III primarily due to the compact Biturbo underpinnings and by the use of a compact powerplant.

After having been displayed in December 1995 at the Bologna Motor Show, a 3.2-litre twin-turbocharged V8 Quattroporte was added to the range in 1996: the new AM578 engine, an evolution of the Shamal V8, generated a maximum power output of 335 PS (247 kW; 330 hp). The top speed was claimed to be . At the same time, some minor updates were introduced on all models: new eight-spoke alloy wheels and aerodynamic wing mirrors, and  seicilindri or ottocilindri (Italian for "six" and "eight-cylinders" respectively) badges on the front fenders, denoting which engine was under the bonnet.

As standard, all the three engines were mated to a Getrag 6-speed manual transmission, while 4-speed automatic transmissions were available on request with the 2.8 and 3.2 engines respectively—4HP22 by ZF Friedrichshafen and a computer-controlled transmission supplied by an Australian firm BTR.

In July 1997, Fiat's subsidiary Ferrari acquired a 50% controlling stake in Maserati S.p.A.. Ferrari immediately undertook a renewal of Maserati's dated production facilities, as well as made improvements to the manufacturing methods and quality control.

The steps taken by the new parent company resulted in the improved Quattroporte Evoluzione which was introduced at the March 1998 Geneva Motor Show. It featured 400 all-new or modified parts out of a total 800 main components. Powertrains and performance remained unvaried, save for the adoption of the same BTR transmission from the 3.2 V8 for the automatic 2.8 V6 model. The Evoluzione no longer had the oval Maserati clock on the dashboard and had redesigned wing mirrors. Ferrari management decided to drop the 2.0 L V6 from the Evoluzione lineup, when they were offered alongside the new 3200 GT, and so the new cars were distinguished from the earlier models by V6 evoluzione or V8 evoluzione badges on the front fenders. Production of the fourth generation of the Quattroporte ended in May 2001 and 2,400 units were made in total with 730 being the Evoluzione versions.

Japanese importer Cornes & Co. ordered a special numbered edition of the Quattroporte for their customers. Cornes Serie Speciale were the last cars built and were limited to only 50 examples. Available in both V6 and V8 Evoluzione variants, all were equipped with the automatic transmission. This special edition is the only Quattroporte to have a Maserati badge inserted into the C-door-pillar. Even though other Evoluziones had the Lassale clock replaced with the Maserati trident, this edition retained the original timepiece.

Specifications
The Quattroporte is a four-door, five-seater saloon with a steel unibody construction. The overall layout remained unchanged from the Biturbo from which the car descended: longitudinal front engine, rear-wheel drive, all-independent suspension with MacPherson struts upfront and trailing arms at the rear. Despite these similarities, the suspension had been re-engineered: rear trailing arms had a tube framework structure like on the Shamal, together with the limited slip differential. These two components were attached to the body via a newly designed tubular subframe.

Engines

Quattroporte V (M139, 2003–2012)

The fifth generation of the Quattroporte (Tipo M139) debuted at the Frankfurt Motor Show on 9 September 2003 and made its U.S. première at the 2003 Pebble Beach Concours d'Elegance; production started in 2003. Exterior and interior design was penned by Pininfarina's then chief designer Ken Okuyama. The last M139 Quattroporte was built on 20 December 2012.

Built on an entirely new platform named the M139, it was  longer than its predecessor and sat on a  longer wheelbase. The same architecture would later underpin the GranTurismo and GranCabrio coupés and convertibles.

Over 5,000 cars were built in 2006.

History

2003–2008
The Maserati Quattroporte was initially offered in only one configuration, equipped with an automated manual transmission, marketed as DuoSelect. The base Quattroporte DuoSelect featured a chrome grille with horizontal slats, adaptive suspension, marketed as Skyhook, 330 mm brake disks with four piston calipers at each wheel. Maserati offered fifteen exterior paint colours, Poltrona Frau leather upholstery in ten colors, contrasting seat piping and stitching and three types of wood inserts.

In 2004, the American luxury department store Neiman Marcus offered a limited edition of the Quattroporte, only available for order through the retailer's 2004 Christmas Catalog at a price of 125,000 USD. Each of the 60 Neiman Marcus Quattroportes was finished in Bordeaux Pontevecchio (wine red) exterior colour and featured a chrome mesh-front grill along with side vents and 19-inch ball-polished wheels. The interior was upholstered in ivory Poltrona Frau leather accented with Bordeaux piping and mahogany wood trim.

At the Frankfurt Motor Show in September 2005, Maserati introduced two different trim levels for the Quattroporte, the Executive GT and Sport GT.

The Quattroporte Executive GT was a comfort and luxury-oriented specification; it came equipped with a wood-rimmed steering wheel, an Alcantara-suede interior roof lining; ventilated, adaptive, massaging rear seats, rear air conditioning controls, veneered retractable rear tables, and curtain shades on the rear windows. The exterior was distinguished by 19 inch eight-spoke ball-polished alloy wheels and chrome mesh front and side grilles.

The Quattroporte Sport GT variant offered several performance upgrades: a re-configured transmission providing faster gearshifts and a firmer Skyhook suspension system; courtesy of new software calibrations, seven-spoke 20 inch wheels with low-profile tyres, cross-drilled brake rotors, and braided brake lines. Model-specific exterior trim included dark mesh front and side grilles and red accents to the Trident badges, as on vintage racing Maserati models. Inside, there were aluminium pedals, a sport steering wheel and carbon fibre in place of the standard wood inserts.

A new 6-speed ZF-supplied automatic transmission was presented at the Detroit Motor Show in January 2007, with the first cars delivered right after the launch, marketed as Maserati Quattroporte Automatica. As all the three trim levels were offered in both DuoSelect and Automatica versions, the lineup grew to six models.

The Quattroporte Sport GT S was introduced at the Frankfurt Motor Show in September 2007. Taking further the Sport GT's focus on handling, this version employed Bilstein single-rate dampers in place of the Skyhook adaptive system. Other changes from the Sport GT were a lowered ride height and 10 mm wider 295/30 rear tyres, front Brembo iron/aluminium dual-cast brake rotors and red-painted six-piston callipers. The cabin was upholstered in mixed Alcantara and leather, with carbon fibre accents; on the exterior, the door handles were painted in body colour, while the exterior trim, the 20 inch wheels and the exhaust pipes were finished in a "dark chrome" shade.

At the 2008 North American International Auto Show, Maserati launched the Quattroporte Collezione Cento, a special edition of the Quattroporte limited to 100 examples.
Its unique specification featured an ivory paint colour with a waist coachline, matched to Cuoio tan tufted leather upholstery and Wengé trim inlaid with mother of pearl. Standard equipment comprised most of the available infotainment options.

2008–2012 facelift

The facelift Quattroporte débuted at the 2008 Geneva Motor Show. Overseen by Pininfarina, the facelift featured redevised bumpers, side sills and wing mirrors (the latter carried over from the GranTurismo), a convex front grille with vertical bars instead of horizontal, new headlights and tail lights with directional bi-xenon main beams and LED turn signals. Inside there was a new navigation and entertainment system.  All Quattroporte models now used the ZF automatic transmission, with the DuoSelect being discontinued.

The 4.2-litre Quattroporte featured single-rate damping comfort-tuned suspension and 18 inch wheels.
In conjunction with the engine, the braking system was upgraded to cross-drilled discs on both axles and dual-cast 360 mm rotors with six piston callipers at the front. Skyhook active damping suspension and 19 inch V-spoke wheels were standard. Trim differences from the standard 4.2-litre cars were limited to a chrome instead of a titanium-coloured front grille.

Production of the facelift Quattroporte models started in June 2008.

The Quattroporte Sport GT S premièred at the North American International Auto Show in January 2009. Other mechanical changes were made to the suspension system, where the Sport GT S single-rate dampers took place of the Skyhook system, ride height was further lowered and stiffer springs were adopted.
The exterior was distinguished by a specific front grille with concave vertical bars, black headlight bezels, red accents on the Trident badges, the absence of chrome window trim, body colour door handles and black double oval exhaust pipes instead of the quad round exhaust pipes found on other Quattroporte models. On the interior, the veneer trim was replaced by "Titan Tex" composite material and the cabin was upholstered in mixed Alcantara and leather.

The Quattroporte Centurion Edition was presented in March 2009 for the UK market. It was special version developed only for the holders of black American Express cards. The car was finished in black exterior colour and with the Centurion logo on the headrests and instrument panel. The engines available were the standard 4.2-litre and 4.7-litre V8.

A special edition of the Quattroporte GT S was introduced at the 2010 Geneva Motor Show: the Quattroporte Sport GT S Awards Edition, celebrating the 56 awards received by the fifth generation of the Quattroporte in just six years since its launch.
Its unique specification consisted of "Nero pianoforte" or specially-developed pale gold "Quarzo fuso" pearlescent paint, satin grey wheels, polished brake callipers and all chrome trim in a dark finish.

Sales

Specifications

Front and rear aluminium subframes support the whole suspension and drivetrain.

A 47%/53% front/rear weight distribution was achieved by setting the engine behind the front axle, inside the wheelbase (front-mid-engine layout) and the adoption of a transaxle layout. With the later automatic transmission - fitted in the conventional position en bloc with the engine - weight distribution changed to 49%/51% front/rear.
The suspension system consists of unequal length control arms with forged aluminium arms and hub carriers, coil springs and anti-roll bars on both axles.

Transmissions
The DuoSelect transmission available at the launch of the fifth generation of the Quattroporte was a development of the Cambiocorsa unit first used in the Maserati Coupé and built by Graziano Trasmissioni. It was a Ferrari-based automated manual transmission, mounted at the rear axle in the block with the differential in a transaxle layout, with the twin-plate dry clutch located in a bell housing attached to the rear of the engine. A torque tube joined rigidly together the two units.
Gear shifting was done via the standard paddle shifters behind the steering wheel; there was no gear lever on the centre tunnel, but rather a small T-shaped handle used to quickly engage first gear and reverse when maneuvering at slow speed.

The 6-speed torque converter automatic transmission was a 6HP26 supplied by ZF Friedrichshafen. Unlike the DuoSelect, it was placed in the conventional position right behind the engine; to accommodate it and the new rear differential the front and rear subframes as well as part of the transmission tunnel had to be redesigned.
Manual shifting was possible by the centre-console mounted gear lever; in addition, Sport GT cars came equipped with paddle shifters as standard, while on other models they were an optional extra. All Quattroporte models were fitted with a limited slip differential.

Engines
The V8 engines of the fifth generation of the Quattroporte belonged to the Ferrari-Maserati F136 family; they had aluminium-silicon alloy block and heads, a crossplane crankshaft, four valves per cylinder driven by two overhead camshafts per bank and continuous variable valve timing on the intake side. F136S 4.2-litre engines in DuoSelect equipped cars used a dry sump lubrication system; F136UC 4.2-litre engines on automatic cars were converted to use a wet sump oiling system, as did the later 4.7-litre, codenamed F136Y.

Coachbuilders

Bellagio Fastback Touring

In 2008, at the Concorso d'Eleganza Villa d'Este, Milanese coachbuilder Carrozzeria Touring Superleggera unveiled the Maserati Bellagio Fastback Touring, a 5-door hatchback built on the chassis of the fifth generation of the Quattroporte.
In May 2013 a Bellagio Fastback was auctioned by RM Auctions at their Villa Erba event, in occasion of Concorso d'Eleganza Villa d'Este; the price was €117,600. According to the auction house, four examples have been built by Carrozzeria Touring.

A Maserati Quattroporte V has also been used as a hearse as seen on the funeral of the Polish president Lech Kaczynski in 2010.

Motorsport
In 2009 Swiss Team announced the development of "Maserati Quattroporte EVO" International Superstars Series racing cars based on the 4.2-litre Quattroporte M139, to be piloted by Andrea Chiesa. Swiss Team fielded the cars in the 2009, 2010, 2011 and 2012 seasons; Italian racing driver Andrea Bertolini won the 2011 championship season at the wheel of a Swiss Team Quattroporte.

Quattroporte VI (M156, 2013–present)

The current and sixth-generation of the Quattroporte was introduced in early 2013. With a  wheelbase it is a considerably larger vehicle than any of its predecessors, to set itself apart from the smaller Ghibli, which shares its underpinnings. Engine choice includes twin-turbocharged V6 and V8 petrol engines, as well as a turbodiesel V6.

History

Development
The new Quattroporte was designed at a special Maserati-only department within the Fiat Group Centro Stile design centre, under the guidance of ex-Pininfarina designer Lorenzo Ramaciotti.
Drivetrains, platform, suspension, and body elements such as the front doors are common to the Quattroporte and the smaller Ghibli saloon, which sits on a  shorter wheelbase. The Quattroporte is manufactured at the Officine Maserati Grugliasco plant in Grugliasco, near Turin, dedicated to Giovanni Agnelli; this former Bertone plant was acquired by Fiat S.p.A. in 2009 and renovated for production of the two cars.

Launch

The current-generation of the 
Quattroporte was unveiled at the North American International Auto Show in Detroit in January 2013. Production started in November 2012. Initially the range included the twin-turbocharged V8 equipped, rear-wheel drive Quattroporte GTS and the entry level Quattroporte equipped with a twin-turbocharged V6 engine; available with Q4 four-wheel drive and rear-wheel drive depending on the market and the choice of the customer. The flagship GTS can be distinguished by its trapezoidal instead of round tail pipes. A V6 turbodiesel model for European markets was introduced in September 2013 at the Frankfurt Motor Show.

2015 Quattroporte Zegna Limited Edition
A total of 100 Quattroporte Zegna Limited editions were produced for worldwide markets in collaboration with Italian fashion house Ermenegildo Zegna. This unique model based on the Quattroporte GTS features unique exterior and interior details including a custom platinum-metallic silk paint scheme with aluminium pigments the exterior of the car along with matching color coordinated 20-inch wheels. On the interior, the seats, panels, roof lining and sunshades are made from specially-milled silk fibers, high performance leather and woolen herringbone fabrics.

2015
At the November 2014 Los Angeles Auto Show Maserati introduced the model year 2015 range. The Quattroporte GTS received mild cosmetic updates, such as new multi-spoke forged alloy wheels, colour-matched lower bodywork, and red-accented Maserati logos, while all models were given upgraded standard equipment and ampler trim choice.

2019
In 2019, the Maserati Quattroporte GTS was awarded "Best Luxury Vehicle" by the Washington Automotive Press Association (WAPA), in Washington DC. The sixth generation Quattroporte is considered as one of the fastest relatively depreciating production cars.

Sales

Specifications

Body and chassis
The Quattroporte uses a mixed steel and aluminium unibody chassis. Front and rear crash structures, the shock towers, the front wings, all four doors, the engine bonnet and the boot lid are made of aluminium.
Front suspension uses unequal length wishbones with a forged aluminium upright/hub carrier, and an anti-roll bar; rear suspension is a 5-link, with four aluminium links and a larger, steel fifth lower arm that also serves as a spring seat.
A front aluminium subframe supports the engine by two mounting points; the steering rack and the lower suspension arms. A rear subframe, made of steel, houses the differential and supports all of the five suspension links. Unlike the predecessors, the new Quattroporte has frameless doors.

Engines and performance
The Quattroporte is offered with range of two petrol engines. The Quattroporte GTS features a variant of the F154 engine platform shared with the Ferrari 488, the Portofino and other Ferrari models. The same engine is shared with the mid-size Ghibli. Both of the engines are designed and assembled by Ferrari.

The V8 engine of the Quattroporte GTS differs from the other members of the Ferrari F154 family, in that the Maserati version has a crossplane crankshaft and wet sump lubrication. Turbine housings and exhaust manifolds are integrated in a single piece.

The V6 engine blocks are cast and machined to Ferrari's specifications respectively in Chrysler's Kokomo, Indiana and Trenton Engine Plant from where they are then shipped to the Ferrari factory in Modena, Italy for assembly.
Apart from the gasoline engines, a diesel engine is also available in the Quattroporte lineage, a  3.0-litre V6 with a single variable geometry turbocharger, designed and assembled by FCA's subsidiary VM Motori.

Transmission
All engines are mated to a ZF-supplied 8HP70 8-speed automatic gearbox, with four-wheel drive available on the V6 in left-hand drive markets only.

The V6 four-wheel drive Q4 drivetrain is the same as that in the Ghibli. Attached to the end of the 8-speed transmission is a transfer case, containing an electronically controlled multi-plate wet clutch, which sends power through a drive shaft to an open differential bolted to the oil pan.
During normal operation the car is rear-wheel drive only; when needed the system can divert up of 50% of engine torque to the front wheels.

See also
 Riverside International Automotive Museum
 Maserati M139 platform

References

External links

 Maserati Quattroporte  official pages

Quattroporte
Full-size vehicles
Luxury vehicles
Rear-wheel-drive vehicles
Sports sedans
Cars introduced in 1963
1970s cars
1980s cars
1990s cars
2000s cars
2010s cars